St George's Church, Tiverton is a Grade I listed parish church in the Church of England in Tiverton, Devon.

History

The church was constructed between 1714 and 1733. The architect was John James.

Nikolaus Pevsner describes the church as having an harmonious interior little disturbed by later alterations.

Organ

The church organ is by Hele & Co. A specification of the organ can be found on the National Pipe Organ Register.

References

Churches completed in 1733
Church of England church buildings in Devon
Grade I listed churches in Devon